|}

The Summer Plate is a Grade 3 National Hunt chase in Great Britain which is open to horses aged four years or older. It is run at Market Rasen over a distance of about 2 miles and 5½ furlongs (2 miles 5 furlongs and 89 yards, or 4,306 metres), and it is scheduled to take place each year in late July.

The race was first run in 1995 as the Summer Festival Handicap Chase, it was awarded Listed status in 2005 and the distance was increased from 2m 3f to 2m 5½f.  The race was upgraded to Grade 3 in 2020.

Winners

See also
 Horse racing in Great Britain
 List of British National Hunt races

References
Racing Post:

National Hunt chases
National Hunt races in Great Britain
Market Rasen Racecourse